Constantin Țurcan (born 3 June 1993) is a Moldavian football defender who plays for FC Dinamo-Auto Tiraspol.

Club statistics
Total matches played in Moldavian First League: 15 matches - 0 goal

References

1993 births
Moldovan footballers
Living people
Association football defenders
FC Dinamo-Auto Tiraspol players